Gerhart Drabsch (11 September 1902 – 9 April 1945) was a German writer. His work was part of the literature event in the art competition at the 1928 Summer Olympics.

Personal life
Drabsch served in the Volkssturm during the final days of the Second World War and was killed in action on 9 April 1945. He was originally listed as missing in action, but his remains were later found and interred at Luckenwalde war cemetery.

See also
List of solved missing person cases

References

1902 births
1945 deaths
20th-century German male writers
Formerly missing people
Missing in action of World War II
Missing person cases in Germany
Olympic competitors in art competitions
People from Potsdam
Volkssturm personnel killed in acton